The Norwegian Authors Union Freedom of Expression Award (Ytringsfrihetsprisen) is an annual prize given by the Norwegian Authors Union. It is not to be confused with the Freedom of Expression Prize of the Fritt Ord organization. The prize is awarded to a writer, journalist, author or editor who has made outstanding efforts to promote freedom of expression and tolerance in the very broadest sense. The nominations are made by an International Committee and a National Board of Members.

The Freedom of Expression Award was a gift from the Ministry of Culture to the Norwegian Authors' Union, on the occasion of the celebration of the 100th anniversary of its founding since 1993.

Awarded

1994 Izzat Ghazzawi, Palestine
1995 İsmail Beşikçi, Turkey
1996 Joar Tranøy, Norway
1997 Yasar Kemal, Nigeria
1998 Axel Jensen, Norway
1999 Yehude Simon Munaro, Peru
2000 Željko Kopanja, Bosnia
2001 Amos Oz, Israel
2002 Anna Politkovskaya, Russia
2003 Pramoedya Ananta Toer, Indonesia
2004 Ragıp Zarakolu, Turkey
2005 Tsegaye Gabre-Medhin, Ethiopia
2006 Simin Behbahani, Iran
2007 Tsering Woeser, Tibet 
2008 Normando Hernández González, Cuba
2009 Dawit Isaak, Eritrea
2010 Ma Thida, Burma 
2011 Ales Bialiatski, Russia
2012 Wera Sæther, Norway
2013 Muharrem Erbey, Turkey
2014 Nguyen Xuan Nghia, Vietnam
2015 Prize awarded but winner wasn't published.
2016 Jael Uribe, Dominican Republic 
2017 Asli Erdoğan
2018 Sumaya Jirde Ali
2019 Dareen Tatour

References

External links 
List of awarded People December 2020

Norwegian awards